Mata Mach'ay (Quechua mata united, mach'ay cave, "united cave", also spelled Matamachay) is a mountain in the Andes of Peru which reaches a height of approximately . It is located in the Junín Region, Jauja Province, Pomacancha District.

References 

Mountains of Peru
Mountains of Junín Region